The Siboney de Cuba is a hybrid breed of cattle optimized for survival in harsh environments. They comprise 5/8 Holstein Friesian (Bos taurus) and 3/8 Zebu (Bos indicus). As such, they are a true hybrid of two species - however, they are fertile (although they do not breed true). 

The breed was originally created in the 1970s to improve the milk yields of the hardy but poor yielding zebu by incorporating genes from the more productive but also more frail Holstein. The result has been an economically viable (and even profitable) animal, incorporating resistance to tropical climatic stresses.

References 
 

Cattle breeds
Dairy cattle breeds